Sharapanjara is a 1971 Indian Kannada language film directed by Puttanna Kanagal, based on a novel by Triveni of the same name, and starring Kalpana and Gangadhar in lead roles. This film is considered one of the best Kannada movies ever made. Triveni's novel was richly visual and Puttanna not only stayed faithful to the novel on screen but also retained most of the novel's dialogues and credited Triveni for them.
 
The film won the award for Best Feature Film in Kannada at the 20th National Film Awards in 1972. It also won three awards at the 1970-71 Karnataka State Film Awards including the award for First Best Film.

The film was later remade in Telugu as Krishnaveni (1974) starring Vanisri.

Plot 
The film revolves around the societal perception of the mentally ill. Kaveri is an educated, sophisticated, and beautiful woman who hails from a loving middle class family. A chance meeting at a friend's wedding and the hero Satish (Gangadhar) falls in love with Kaveri. They get married with the blessings of their parents. They build their dream house, have a son, buy a car - they not only form a picture-perfect couple but are also generally prosperous. When Kaveri conceives for the second time, the doctor expresses concern over her health. Once the baby is born,  Kaveri is tormented by memories of forcefully losing her virginity during her college days and develops symptoms of post-partum psychosis. She is admitted to an in-house mental healthcare facility for treatment.

After recovery, when Kaveri returns home, Satish treats her with callousness. Kaveri faces scorn of some sort or the other from her family, neighbours and society in general, as well, owing to the stigma around mental illness. Eventually when Kaveri discovers that her husband is having an extra-marital relationship with a female colleague, her post-partum psychosis symptoms relapse and he has to be readmitted to the mental healthcare facility.

The movie dwells on two major social issues. One, the social acceptability of mental illness. The general response Kaveri receives from her cook and servants, her family members and neighbours, depicts the lack of sensitivity that is so much needed for people like Kaveri, and the repercussions. Two, the male ego and entitlement - her husband spurns her because of her past incident and uses it as an alibi to be unfaithful to her. In addition, even her guilt and trauma stem from her friend from college forcing himself on her.

Cast 

 Kalpana as Kaveri
 Gangadhar as Satish, Kaveri's husband
 Srinath as Sudheer, Satish's friend (cameo) 
 Leelavathi as Vijaya, Sathish's sister
 K. S. Ashwath as Narayanappa, Kaveri's father
 Advani Lakshmi Devi as Vishali, Kaveri's mother
 Chindodi Leela as Vimala
 M. N. Lakshmi Devi as Maithili
 Shivaram as Bhatta
 Narasimharaju as Maithili's husband
 Loknath as a psychologist
 R. T. Rama 
 Kala
 Jayamma
 G. V. Malathamma
 G. V. Swarnamma
 Jr. Jayanthi
 Bangalore Nagesh
 Ganapathi Bhat
 Sharapanjara Iyengar as Iyengar, Satish's colleague
 G. M. Nanjappa
 K. M. Cariappa as guest in wedding (uncredited)
 Puttanna Kanagal as guest in wedding (uncredited)

Soundtrack
The soundtrack composed by Vijaya Bhaskar was well received by the audience.

Reception
The film was a big hit and ran for one year in Karnataka in about three theatres. Kaveri portrayed by Kalpana is one of the most widely acclaimed characters in Kannada cinema. Kalpana's performance as a woman dealing with trauma was widely acclaimed by critics. The movie was the biggest milestone of Kalpana's illustrious career.

Awards 
20th National Film Awards
 Best Feature Film in Kannada

Filmfare Awards South
The film won Filmfare Award for Best Film – Kannada (1971) 

1970–71 Karnataka State Film Awards
 First Best Film – C. S. Raja
 Best Actress – Kalpana
 Best Screenplay – Puttanna Kanagal

15th International Film Festival of India
 Screened in Kannada cinema Retrospect section.

References

External links
 

1971 films
1970s Kannada-language films
Films based on Indian novels
Kannada films remade in other languages
Films directed by Puttanna Kanagal
Films scored by Vijaya Bhaskar
Kannada literature
Best Kannada Feature Film National Film Award winners